Sara Anne Wood (born March 4, 1981) is a missing child who was last seen on August 18, 1993.

Wood disappeared on a quiet road near her home. A known murderer named Lewis S. Lent Jr. was charged with abducting Wood in 1996, three years after she was last seen, the reason being that Lent originally had claimed that he had killed Sara and that he had buried her body in the Adirondacks. But when he drew a map of the burial location for the police, extensive searches were conducted, but did not produce any evidence as to Wood's whereabouts and nothing was found. Lent had also pleaded guilty to the 1990 kidnapping and murder of 12-year-old Pittsfield, Massachusetts, native Jimmy Bernardo. Lent abducted Bernardo from the Pittsfield movie theater where Lent worked as a janitor. Lent later recanted to killing Wood, yet he was sentenced to 25 years to life for the Wood murder, and was sentenced to life without parole for the Bernardo murder, and is in prison in Massachusetts. He is suspected in a number of other child kidnapping cases.

Disappearance
Wood was last seen when she was riding her bicycle at 2:30 pm on August 18, 1993, after leaving her church in Sauquoit, New York. During the evening that Wood disappeared, her bicycle, coloring book and crayons were discovered hidden in an area of brush off of Hacadam Road. Wood was last seen wearing a pink T-shirt with the words "Guess Who" embroidered on the front, with turquoise blue shorts, and with brown sandals.

Investigation and aftermath
In 1994, a known child murderer named Lewis S. Lent Jr. confessed to the abduction and murder of Wood. Lent made this confession while in police custody in Massachusetts for another child-victim crime. Massachusetts authorities would not extradite Lent to New York until the trial in Massachusetts was over. Lent claimed that he had killed Wood and that he had buried her body in the Adirondacks. When Lent drew a map of the burial location for the police, extensive searches were conducted, but they did not produce any evidence as to Wood's whereabouts.

Lent was charged with abducting Wood in 1996.

In 2015, the case was reopened; it remains unsolved.

See also
List of people who disappeared

References

1990s missing person cases
1993 in New York (state)
Crimes in New York (state)
Missing person cases in New York (state)
Missing American children
Murder convictions without a body